

Total Commander (formerly Windows Commander) is a shareware orthodox file manager for Windows, Windows Phone, Windows Mobile/Windows CE and  Android, developed by Christian Ghisler. Originally coded using Delphi, latest Windows 64-bit versions were developed with Lazarus. It features a built-in FTP client, tabbed interface, file compare, archive file navigation, and a multi-rename tool with regular expression support. It is for the most part compatible with Linux using Wine.

The utility supports extensibility via plugins, and it can bind external programs for viewing or editing files. Many plugins are freely available, e.g. different packer formats or file viewer for special file formats. Many functions not available by default are supported and can be assigned to icons.

From 1993 until 2002, Total Commander was called Windows Commander. The name was changed in 2002 after Microsoft pointed out that the word "Windows" was their trademark.

See also 
Comparison of file managers
Comparison of FTP client software
Far Manager
USB On-The-Go

References

External links 

Total Commander Wiki

Orthodox file managers
Pocket PC software
Windows Mobile Standard software
Utilities for Windows
FTP clients
Shareware
File comparison tools
Pascal (programming language) software